Pisa San Rossore railway station is a railway station in the Italian city of Pisa, the second station of the city in terms of passengers, after Pisa Centrale railway station. The station is located next to Piazza dei Miracoli and is served by local trains. It is a keilbahnhof, situated at the junction of two railway lines: Pisa–La Spezia–Genoa and Lucca–Pisa.

Station
The main facility is currently closed for passengers, but there are many automatic ticket offices, snack machines and a waiting room available. Inside the station there are six platforms (four to La Spezia and Genoa and two to Lucca), all equipped with elevators and connected by a subway.

Interchange
Urban bus lines stops close to the station, and there is a bike-sharing station at one of the entrances.

References

Railway stations in Tuscany
Buildings and structures in Pisa